Cyro Versiani dos Anjos (October 5, 1906 – August 4, 1994) was a Brazilian journalist, and writer.

He was born in Montes Claros, in the state of Minas Gerais. In 1923, he went to Belo Horizonte, where he studied law at Federal University of Minas Gerais and graduated in 1932. He died in Rio de Janeiro, state of Rio de Janeiro, aged 87.

Bibliography

 O Amauense Belmiro, novel 1937, translated and published in Mexico and Italy
 Montanha, 1950
 Abdias, novel, 1945
 A Criação Literária, essay, 1959
 Montanha, novel, 1956
 Poemas Coronarianos, poetry, 1964
 Explorações no Tempo,1952
 A Menina do Sobrado, 1979

External links
 Biography of Cyro dos Anjos 
Cyro dos Anjos recorded at the Library of Congress for the Hispanic Division's audio literary archive on March 24, 1977

1906 births
1994 deaths
Brazilian male poets
20th-century Brazilian poets
20th-century Brazilian male writers